Genesis Revisited, called Watcher of the Skies: Genesis Revisited in the US, is the 12th studio album by Steve Hackett, paying tribute to his former band, Genesis.  It mainly features songs originally released by Genesis during Hackett's tenure with the group (1971–77).  The previously unreleased song "Déjà Vu" was started by Peter Gabriel in 1973 during the Selling England by the Pound sessions but not finished and Hackett completed the song for this album. There are also two new songs, "Valley of the Kings" and "Waiting Room Only"; the latter is named after and loosely inspired by "The Waiting Room", an instrumental from the 1974 Genesis album The Lamb Lies Down on Broadway. The Japanese version of the album contains one extra song called "Riding the Colossus".

Track listing

Personnel
Steve Hackett – guitar (1–11), vocals (2, 8, 10), harmonica (9), percussion (11), backing vocals (1, 5), orchestration (1, 4, 5, 6, 8)
John Wetton – vocals (1, 5), bass (5)
Paul Carrack – vocals (4, 7)
Colin Blunstone – vocals (6)
John Hackett – flute (8)
Will Bates – saxophone (2, 9, 10)
Ian McDonald – saxophone (11), flute (11)
"Spats" King – vibes (10)
Julian Colbeck – keyboards (1, 2, 8)
Roger King – additional programming (1, 4, 5, 8), keyboards (4, 9, 10, 11), orchestration (4, 5), programming (9, 11)
Ben Fenner – additional programming (1, 4, 8), keyboards (5), orchestration (4, 5, 6), programming (5)
Nick Magnus – keyboards (3), programming (3)
Jerry Peal – keyboards (3), programming (3)
Aron Friedman – orchestration (6, 7), keyboards (7, 10), programming (7), piano (10)
Tony Levin – bass (1)
Alphonso Johnson – bass (2, 8)
Pino Palladino – bass (4, 11)
Bill Bruford – drums (1, 5), percussion (5)
Chester Thompson – drums (2, 8), additional drums (11)
Hugo Degenhardt – drums (3, 4, 9, 11)
Tarquin Bombast – drums (10)
Richard Macphail – backing vocals (7)
Jeanne Downs – backing vocals (7)
Richard Wayler – backing vocals (7)
The Sanchez/Montoya Chorale (4, 9)
 Anton De Bruck - chorale director 
Royal Philharmonic Orchestra (1, 4, 5, 6, 7, 8)

References

1996 albums
Steve Hackett albums
Genesis (band) tribute albums